Two vessels of the Royal Navy have been named HMS Stonehenge after the prehistoric monument of Stonehenge.

  was an S-class submarine, built in 1943 and lost in 1944 in the Malacca Straits.

References
 

Royal Navy ship names